Stegosauria is a group of herbivorous ornithischian dinosaurs that lived during the Jurassic and early Cretaceous periods. Stegosaurian fossils have been found mostly in the Northern Hemisphere, predominantly in what is now North America, Europe, Africa, South America and Asia. Their geographical origins are unclear; the earliest unequivocal stegosaurian, Huayangosaurus taibaii, lived in China.

Stegosaurians were armored dinosaurs (thyreophorans). Originally, they did not differ much from more primitive members of that group, being small, low-slung, running animals protected by armored scutes. An early evolutionary innovation was the development of spikes as defensive weapons. Later species, belonging to a subgroup called the Stegosauridae, became larger, and developed long hindlimbs that no longer allowed them to run. This increased the importance of active defence by the thagomizer, which could ward off even large predators because the tail was in a higher position, pointing horizontally to the rear from the broad pelvis. Stegosaurids had complex arrays of spikes and plates running along their backs, hips and tails.

The first stegosaurian finds in the early 19th century were fragmentary. Better fossil material, of the genus Dacentrurus, was discovered in 1874 in England. Soon after, in 1877, the first nearly-complete skeleton was discovered in the United States. Professor Othniel Charles Marsh that year classified such specimens in the new genus Stegosaurus, from which the group acquired its name, and which is still by far the most famous stegosaurian. During the latter half of the twentieth century, many important Chinese finds were made, representing about half of the presently known diversity of stegosaurians.

Description

Skull
Stegosaurians had characteristic small, long, flat, narrow heads and a horn-covered beak or rhamphotheca, which covered the front of the snout (two premaxillaries) and lower jaw (a single predentary) bones. Similar structures are seen in turtles and birds. Apart from Huayangosaurus, stegosaurians subsequently lost all premaxillary teeth within the upper beak. Huayangosaurus still had seven per side. The upper and lower jaws are equipped with rows of small teeth. Later species have a vertical bone plate covering the outer side of the lower jaw teeth. The structure of the upper jaw, with a low ridge above, and running parallel to, the tooth row, indicates the presence of a fleshy cheek. In stegosaurians, the typical archosaurian skull opening, the antorbital fenestra in front of the eye socket, is small, sometimes reduced to a narrow horizontal slit.

Postcranial skeleton
All stegosaurians are quadrupedal, with hoof-like toes on all four limbs. All stegosaurians after Huayangosaurus have forelimbs much shorter than their hindlimbs. Their hindlimbs are long and straight, designed to carry the weight of the animal while stepping. The condyles of the lower thighbone are short from the front to the rear. This would have limited the supported rotation of the knee joint, making running impossible. Huayangosaurus had a thighbone like a running animal. The upper leg was always longer than the lower leg.

Huayangosaurus had relatively long and slender arms. The forelimbs of later forms are very robust, with a massive humerus and ulna. The wrist bones were reinforced by a fusion into two blocks, an ulnar and a radial. The front feet of stegosaurians are commonly depicted in art and in museum displays with fingers splayed out and slanted downward. However, in this position, most bones in the hand would be disarticulated. In reality, the hand bones of stegosaurians were arranged into vertical columns, with the main fingers, orientated outwards, forming a tube-like structure. This is similar to the hands of sauropod dinosaurs, and is also supported by evidence from stegosaurian footprints and fossils found in a lifelike pose.

The long hindlimbs elevated the tail base, such that the tail pointed out behind the animal almost horizontally from that high position. While walking, the tail would not have sloped downwards as this would have impeded the function of the tail base retractor muscles, to pull the thighbones backwards. However, it has been suggested by Robert Thomas Bakker that stegosaurians could rear on their hind legs to reach higher layers of plants, the tail then being used as a "third leg". The mobility of the tail was increased by a reduction or absence of ossified tendons, that with many Ornithischia stiffen the hip region. Huayangosaurus still possessed them. In species that had short forelimbs, the relatively short torso towards the front curved strongly downwards. The dorsal vertebrae typically were very high, with very tall neural arches and transverse processes pointing obliquely upwards to almost the level of the neural spine top. Stegosaurian back vertebrae can easily be identified by this unique configuration. The tall neural arches often house deep neural canals; enlarged canals in the sacral vertebrae have given rise to the incorrect notion of a "second brain". Despite the downwards curvature of the rump, the neck base was not very low and the head was held a considerable distance off the ground. The neck was flexible and moderately long. Huayangosaurus still had the probably original number of nine cervical vertebrae; Miragaia has an elongated neck with seventeen.

The stegosaurian shoulder girdle was very robust. In Huayangosaurus, the acromion, a process on the lower front edge of the shoulderblade, was moderately developed; the coracoid was about as wide as the lower end of the scapula, with which it formed the shoulder joint. Later forms tend to have a strongly expanded acromion, while the coracoid, largely attached to the acromion, no longer extends to the rear lower corner of the scapula. Ossified sternal plates have never been found with Stegosauria and perhaps the sternum was completely absent.

The stegosaurian pelvis was originally moderately large, as shown by Huayangosaurus. Later species, however, convergent to the Ankylosauria developed very broad pelves, in which the iliac bones formed wide horizontal plates with flaring front blades to allow for an enormous belly-gut. The ilia were attached to the sacral vertebrae via a sacral yoke formed by fused sacral ribs. Huayangosaurus still had rather long and obliquely oriented ischia and pubic bones. In more derived species, these became more horizontal and shorter to the rear, while the front prepubic process lengthened.

Osteoderms
Like all Thyreophora, stegosaurians were protected by bony scutes that were not part of the skeleton proper but skin ossifications instead: the so-called osteoderms. Huayangosaurus had several types. On its neck, back, and tail were two rows of paired small vertical plates and spikes. The very tail end bore a small club. Each flank had a row of smaller osteoderms, culminating in a long shoulder spine in front, curving to the rear. Later forms show very variable configurations, combining plates of various shape and size on the neck and front torso with spikes more to the rear of the animal. They seem to have lost the tail club and the flank rows are apparently absent also, with the exception of the shoulder spine, still shown by Kentrosaurus and extremely developed, as its name indicates, in Gigantspinosaurus. As far as is known, all forms possessed some sort of thagomizer, though these are rarely preserved articulated allowing to establish the exact arrangement. A fossil of Chungkingosaurus sp. has been reported with three pairs of spikes pointing outwards and a fourth pair pointing to the rear. The most derived species, like Stegosaurus, Hesperosaurus and Wuerhosaurus, have very large and flat back plates. To discern them from the smaller plates, which are intermediate to spines in having a thickened central section, these latter are sometimes called 'splates'. Stegosaurus plates are so large that it has been suggested that they were not arranged in paired but alternated rows or even formed a single overlapping midline row. With Stegosaurus fossils also ossicles have been found in the throat region, bony skin discs that protected the lower neck. Apart from protection, suggested functions of the osteoderms include display, species recognition and thermoregulation.

Discovery
The first known discovery of a possible stegosaurian was probably made in the early nineteenth century in England. It consisted of a lower jaw fragment and was in 1848 named Regnosaurus. In 1845, in the area of the present state of South Africa, remains were discovered that much later would be named Paranthodon. In 1874, other remains from England were named Craterosaurus. All three taxa were based on fragmentary material and were not recognised as possible stegosaurians until the twentieth century. They gave no reason to suspect the existence of a new distinctive group of dinosaurs.

In 1874, extensive remains of what was clearly a large herbivore equipped with spikes were uncovered in England; the first partial stegosaurian skeleton known. They were named Omosaurus by Richard Owen in 1875. Later, this name was shown to be preoccupied by the phytosaur Omosaurus and the stegosaurian was renamed Dacentrurus. Other English nineteenth century and early twentieth century finds would be assigned to Omosaurus; later they would, together with French fossils, be partly renamed Lexovisaurus and Loricatosaurus.

In 1877, Arthur Lakes, a fossil hunter working for Professor Othniel Charles Marsh, in Wyoming excavated a fossil that Marsh the same year named Stegosaurus. At first, Marsh still entertained some incorrect notions about its morphology. He assumed that the plates formed a flat skin cover — hence the name, meaning "roof saurian" — and that the animal was bipedal with the spikes sticking out sideways from the rear of the skull. A succession of additional discoveries from the Como Bluff sites allowed a quick update of the presumed build. In 1882, Marsh was able to publish the first skeletal reconstruction of a stegosaur. Hereby, stegosaurians became much better known to the general public. The American finds at the time represented the bulk of known stegosaurian fossils, with about twenty skeletons collected.

The next important discovery was made when a German expedition to the Tendaguru, then part of German East Africa, from 1909 to 1912 excavated over a thousand bones of Kentrosaurus. The finds increased the known variability of the group, Kentrosaurus being rather small and having long rows of spikes on the hip and tail.

From the 1950s onwards, the geology of China was systematically surveyed in detail and infrastructural works led to a vast increase of digging activities in that country. This resulted in a new wave of Chinese stegosaurian discoveries, starting with Chialingosaurus in 1957. Chinese finds of the 1970s and 1980s included Wuerhosaurus, Tuojiangosaurus, Chungkingosaurus, Huayangosaurus, Yingshanosaurus and Gigantspinosaurus. This increased the age range of good fossil stegosaurian material, as they represented the first relatively complete skeletons from the Middle Jurassic and the Early Cretaceous. Especially important was Huayangosaurus, which provided unique information about the early evolution of the group.

Towards the end of the twentieth century, the so-called Dinosaur Renaissance took place in which a vast increase in scientific attention was given to the Dinosauria. In 2007, Jiangjunosaurus was reported, the first Chinese dinosaur named since 1994. Nevertheless, European and North-American sites have become productive again during the 1990s, Miragaia having been found in the Lourinhã Formation in Portugal and a number of relatively complete Hesperosaurus skeletons having been excavated in Wyoming. Apart from the fossils per se, important new insights have been gained by applying the method of cladistics, allowing for the first time to exactly calculate stegosaurian evolutionary relationships.

Classification

The Stegosauria was originally named as an order within Reptilia by O.C. Marsh in 1877.

The vast majority of stegosaurian dinosaurs thus far recovered belong to the Stegosauridae, which lived in the later part of the Jurassic and early Cretaceous, and which were defined by Paul Sereno as all stegosaurians more closely related to Stegosaurus than to Huayangosaurus. They include per definition the well-known Stegosaurus. This group is widespread, with members across the Northern Hemisphere, Africa and possibly South America.

The first exact clade definition of Stegosauria was given by Peter Malcolm Galton in 1997: all thyreophoran Ornithischia more closely related to Stegosaurus than to Ankylosaurus. Thus defined, the Stegosauria are by definition the sister group of the Ankylosauria within the Eurypoda.

Phylogeny
Kenneth Carpenter of the Denver Museum of Nature and Science published a preliminary phyletic tree of stegosaurians, in the 2001 description of Hesperosaurus. An updated phylogeny was published by Mateus et al. (2009), which is shown below.

Alternately, in 2017, Raven and Maidment published a new phylogenetic analysis, including almost every known stegosaurian genus:

Undescribed species
To date, several genera from China bearing names have been proposed but not formally described, including "Changdusaurus". Until formal descriptions are published, these genera are regarded as nomina nuda. Yingshanosaurus, for a long time considered a nomen nudum, was described in 1994.

Evolutionary history

Like the spikes and shields of ankylosaurs, the bony plates and spines of stegosaurians evolved from the low-keeled osteoderms characteristic of basal thyreophorans. One such described genus, Scelidosaurus, is proposed to be morphologically close to the last common ancestor of the clade uniting stegosaurians and ankylosaurians, the Eurypoda. Galton (2019) interpreted plates of an armored dinosaur from the Lower Jurassic (Sinemurian-Pliensbachian) Lower Kota Formation of India as fossils of a member of Ankylosauria; the author argued that this finding indicates a probable early Early Jurassic origin for both Ankylosauria and its sister group Stegosauria. Footprints attributed to the ichnotaxon Deltapodus brodricki from the Middle Jurassic (Aalenian) of England represent the oldest probable record of stegosaurians reported so far. Outside that, there are assigned fossils to stegosauria from the Toarcian: the specimen "IVPP V.219", a chimaera with bones of the sauropod Sanpasaurus is known from the Maanshan Member of the Ziliujing Formation. The perhaps most basal known stegosaurian, the four-metre-long Huayangosaurus, is still close to Scelidosaurus in build, with a higher and shorter skull, a short neck, a low torso, long slender forelimbs, short hindlimbs, large condyles on the thighbone, a narrow pelvis, long ischial and pubic shafts, and a relatively long tail. Its small tail club might be a eurypodan synapomorphy. Huayangosaurus lived during the Bathonian stage of the Middle Jurassic, about 166 million years ago.

A few million years later, during the Callovian-Oxfordian, from China much larger species are known, with long, "graviportal" (adapted for moving only in a slow manner on land due to a high body weight) hindlimbs: Chungkingosaurus, Chialingosaurus, Tuojiangosaurus and Gigantspinosaurus. Most of these are considered members of the derived Stegosauridae. Lexovisaurus and Loricatosaurus, stegosaurid finds from England and France of approximately equivalent age to the Chinese specimens, are likely the same taxon. During the Late Jurassic, stegosaurids seem to have experienced their greatest radiation. In Europe, Dacentrurus and the closely related Miragaia were present. While older finds had been limited to the northern continents, in this phase Gondwana was colonised also as shown by Kentrosaurus living in Africa. No unequivocal stegosaurian fossils have been reported from South-America, India, Madagascar, Australia, or Antarctica, though. A Late Jurassic Chinese stegosaurian is Jiangjunosaurus. The most derived Jurassic stegosaurians are known from North-America: Stegosaurus (perhaps several species thereof) and the somewhat older Hesperosaurus. Stegosaurus was quite large (some specimens indicate a length of at least seven metres), had high plates, no shoulder spine, and a short, deep rump.

From the Early Cretaceous, far fewer finds are known and it seems that the group had declined in diversity. Some fragmentary fossils have been described, such as Craterosaurus from England and Paranthodon from South Africa. The only more substantial discoveries are those of Wuerhosaurus from Northern China, the exact age of which is highly uncertain Indeterminate stegosaurs are known from the Early Cretaceous of Siberia, including the Ilek Formation and Batylykh Formation. The youngest known definitive remains of stegosaurs are those of Mongolostegus from Mongolia which dates the Aptian-Albian.

It has often been suggested that the decline in stegosaur diversity was part of a Jurassic-Cretaceous transition, where angiosperms become the dominant plants, causing a faunal turnover where new groups of herbivores evolved. Although in general the case for such a causal relation is poorly supported by the data, stegosaurians are an exception in that their decline coincides with that of the Cycadophyta.

Though Late Cretaceous stegosaurian fossils have been reported, these have mostly turned out to be misidentified. A well-known example is Dravidosaurus, known from Coniacian fossils found in India. Though originally thought to be stegosaurian, in 1991 these badly-eroded fossils were suggested to instead have been based on plesiosaurian pelvis and hindlimb material, and none of the fossils are demonstrably stegosaurian. The reinterpretation of Dravidosaurus as a plesiosaur wasn't accepted by Galton and Upchurch (2004), who stated that the skull and plates of Dravidosaurus are certainly not plesiosaurian, and noted the need to redescribe the fossil material of Dravidosaurus. A purported stegosaurian dermal plate was reported from the latest Cretaceous (Maastrichtian) Kallamedu Formation (southern India); however, Galton & Ayyasami (2017) interpreted the specimen as a bone of a sauropod dinosaur. Nevertheless, the authors considered the survival of stegosaurians into the Maastrichtian to be possible, noting the presence of the stegosaurian ichnotaxon Deltapodus in the Maastrichtian Lameta Formation (western India).

Paleobiology

Trace fossils
Stegosaurian tracks were first recognized in 1996 from a hindprint-only trackway discovered at the Cleveland-Lloyd quarry, which is located near Price, Utah. Two years later, a new ichnogenus called Stegopodus was erected for another set of stegosaurian tracks which were found near Arches National Park, also in Utah. Unlike the first, this trackway preserved traces of the forefeet. Fossil remains indicate that stegosaurians have five digits on the forefeet and three weight-bearing digits on the hind feet. From this, scientists were able to predict the appearance of stegosaurian tracks in 1990, six years in advance of the first actual discovery of Morrison stegosaurian tracks. More trackways have been found since the erection of Stegopodus. None, however, have preserved traces of the front feet and stegosaurian traces remain rare.

Deltapodus is an ichnogenus attributed as stegosaurian prints, and are known across Europe, North Africa, and China. One Deltapodus footprint measures less than 6 cm in length and represents the smallest known stegosaurian track. Some tracks preserve exquisite scally skin pattern.

Australia's 'Dinosaur Coast' in Broome, Western Australia includes tracks of several different thyreophoran track-makers. Of these, the ichnogenus Garbina (a Nyulnyulan word for 'shield') and Luluichnus (honours the late Paddy Roe, OAM who went by the name 'Lulu') have been considered registered by stegosaurs. Garbina includes the largest stegosaur tracks measuring 80 cm in length. Trackway data show Garbina track-makers were capable of bipedal and quadrupedal progression.

While has no body fossil evidence currently known for stegosaurs, handprints from underground coal mines near Oakey, Queensland, resembling Garbina tracks suggests their occurrence in this country from at least the Middle to Upper Jurassic (Callovian–Tithonian). A single plaster cast of one of these handprints is in the collections of the Queensland Museum.

Tail spikes 
There has been debate about whether the spikes were used simply for display, as posited by Gilmore in 1914, or used as a weapon. Robert Bakker noted that it is likely that the stegosaur tail was much more flexible than those of other ornithischian dinosaurs because it lacked ossified tendons, thus lending credence to the idea of the tail as a weapon. He also observed that Stegosaurus could have maneuvered its rear easily by keeping its large hindlimbs stationary and pushing off with its very powerfully muscled but short forelimbs, allowing it to swivel deftly to deal with attack. In 2010, analysis of a digitized model of Kentrosaurus aethiopicus showed that the tail could bring the thagomizer around to the sides of the dinosaur, possibly striking an attacker beside it.

In 2001, a study of tail spikes by McWhinney et al., showed a high incidence of trauma-related damage. This too supports the theory that the spikes were used in combat. There is also evidence for Stegosaurus defending itself, in the form of an Allosaurus tail vertebra with a partially healed puncture wound that fits a Stegosaurus tail spike. Discoveries of articulated stegosaur armor show that, at least in some species, these spikes protruded horizontally from the tail, not vertically as is often depicted. Initially, Marsh described S. armatus as having eight spikes in its tail, unlike S. stenops. However, recent research re-examined this and concluded this species also had four.

References

External links

 Stegosauria on Palaeos.com
 https://web.archive.org/web/20080727011652/http://www.kheper.net/evolution/dinosauria/Stegosauria.htm

 
Bajocian first appearances
Early Cretaceous extinctions
Fossil taxa described in 1877
Taxa named by Othniel Charles Marsh